Kavanagh is a novel by the American poet Henry Wadsworth Longfellow.

Overview
Longfellow began writing the story in 1847 and it was published in 1849. Kavanagh is the story of a country romance. Besides a character named Kavanagh, among its characters is a school teacher named Mr. Churchill, who has always planned to write a romance, but whose procrastination never allows him to start, until late in life he resigns himself to his "destiny".

Longfellow also used the novel to argue against the view, in the book propounded by a character based on Cornelius Mathews, that American literature must be entirely devoid of European influences and be exclusively national. Instead, Longfellow felt that American literature could and should be universalist, with its unique North American influences. He saw the use of European models not as imitation but as a "continuation" that Americans could be proud of.

Of the novel, Robert L. Gale writes in A Henry Wadsworth Longfellow Companion that

Kavanagh was also a precursor of local color writing, and "it depicts what is probably the first lesbian relationship in American fiction".

References

Online text
 Etext at the University of Virginia Library
 Scanned book at Google Books

1849 American novels
Novels by Henry Wadsworth Longfellow